2014 Sagan Tosu season.

League table

J1 League

References

External links
 J.League official site

Sagan Tosu
Sagan Tosu seasons